V-Town may refer to:

Virginiatown, Ontario, Canada
Visalia, California, United States
Vlaardingen, Rotterdam, The Netherlands